The following is a list of 3D animation apps that have articles in Wikipedia.

See also 
 List of 2D animation software
 List of 3D computer graphics software
 List of 3D modeling software
 Comparison of 3D computer graphics software

References

3D animation
Animation